Dzun-Khemchiksky District (Çöön-Xemçik kojuun) is an administrative and municipal district (raion, or kozhuun), one of the seventeen in the Tuva Republic, Russia. It is located in the west of the republic. Its administrative center is the town of Chadan. Population:  21,361 (2002 Census);  The population of Chadan accounts for 45.4% of the district's total population.

References

Notes

Sources

Districts of Tuva